Rouch is a surname. Notable people with the surname include:

Jean Rouch (1917–2004), French film director and anthropologist
Mickaël Rouch (born 1993), French rugby league footballer
Peter Rouch (born 1966), British Anglican clergyman

See also
Rouch Point, a headland of Antarctica